Architectonica perspectiva, whose common name is the clear or perspective sundial shell, is a species of sea snail, a marine gastropod mollusk in the family Architectonicidae, which are known as the staircase shells or sundials.

Description and habitat 
The snails have a shell 5 to 7 centimeters in diameter. The cone-like shell coils up from a flat base. The spirals are composed of vibrant shades of black, white, and brown. The body and its tentacles are stripped as well to match the shell. Its operculum is made of a horn-like material. The snail is common in Indo-Pacific Asia and around India. The snail often lives among coral reefs, and enjoys sandy seafloors.

References

External links 

 

Architectonicidae
Gastropods described in 1758
Taxa named by Carl Linnaeus